Aster altaicus is a species of plant belonging to the family Asteraceae.

Its native range is Temperate Asia.

References

altaicus